Petén or Peten may refer to:
Petén Department, a department of Guatemala
Petén Basin, the geographical/archaeological region of Mesoamerica and a center of the Maya civilization
Lake Petén Itzá, a lake in the Petén Basin region
Peten Itza kingdom, a kingdom in modern-day Central America centered on the city of Nojpetén
The Hebrew name for the Boeing AH-64A Apache in Israeli service, meaning "Cobra" in English
Peten (Egypt), a place name in Ancient Egypt